Bradley King is an American theatrical lighting designer, best known for his work on the musicals Natasha, Pierre & The Great Comet of 1812 and Hadestown, for which he won the Tony Award for Best Lighting Design in a Musical in 2017 and 2019, respectively.

Early life and education 
King grew up in Baltimore, Maryland, where he attended Gilman School, private college preparatory school. He attended New York University's Tisch School of the Arts and earned a BFA in theatrical directing, and later earned an MFA in design. He is married to Danielle King, managing producer of The Tank; the couple have two children.

Awards and nominations

References 

Year of birth missing (living people)
Living people
Tisch School of the Arts alumni
Tony Award winners
American lighting designers